Henry Hudson Park is a small park in the center of Spuyten Duyvil, Bronx in New York City, located at the intersection of Kappock Street and Independence Avenue. The park contains a small overlook above Spuyten Duyvil Creek, named Half Moon overlook after the ship Hudson sailed into the eponymous river.

The park is named after famed English explorer Henry Hudson, who is also the namesake of the nearby Hudson River, Henry Hudson Parkway and Henry Hudson Bridge. In 1906 it was decided to dedicate a monument celebrating the 300th anniversary of Hudson's arrival in what later became Lower New York Bay. The project encountered multiple delays, but in 1909 the city obtained the money, and in 1912 a  Doric column, designed by Walter Cook of Babb, Cook & Welch,  was set in place, but shortly after, funds for the project, which had been raised by subscription, ran out. It was revived by Robert Moses in the late 1930s, and by 1938, the area around the monument had been designated as a park and a   bronze statue of Henry Hudson, sculpted by Karl Bitter and Karl Gruppe, had been placed atop the column.

The park underwent major renovations in 1989 and 1995, mainly due to the efforts of local community activist Paul Cymerman. For his dedication and volunteerism, a small playground area of the park was renamed Paul's Park in 2003, the only New York City park to be named for a living person. After his death in 2004, the local community continued his efforts to keep the park safe and clean.

References
Notes

Sources
 Henry Hudson Park, NYC Parks

External links

Parks in the Bronx
Urban public parks
Robert Moses projects
Spuyten Duyvil, Bronx